The fourth season of the original Mission: Impossible originally aired Sundays at 10:00–11:00 pm (EST) on CBS from September 28, 1969 to March 29, 1970.

Cast

Episodes

References

4
1969 American television seasons
1970 American television seasons